Rostov-on-Don Zoo is one of the largest zoos in Russia, covering almost 90 hectares. Located in Rostov-on-Don, this zoo is home to over 5,000 animals, including very rare species such as the Amur tiger.

The zoo is a member of 38 programs involved in the conservation of endangered animals, and was one of the first zoos in Europe to breed white-tailed eagles. It features such animals as tigers, lions, pygmy hippopotamus, Asian elephants, Dagestan and Bezoar goats, Siamese crocodiles, and flamingos. Rostov-on-Don Zoo is a member of then International Species Information System. A large park is a main feature of the zoo, making it a popular place among local citizens.

History 

The zoo was founded in June 1927 to serve as a pet enclosure for a nearby school named after Marshal S. M. Budyonny (now known as School No. 43 on Budennovsky Street, 64). Vladimir Kegel was the first headmaster of the Zoo.

The school's collection of animals was moved to the outskirts of the town in the autumn of 1929.

In 1930, some exotic animals, such as elephants, lions, tigers, pumas, leopards, crocodiles, sea lions, pythons, monkeys, parrots, llamas and ostriches were added to the zoo.

In 1935, the zoo's emu population had a significant increase in the amount of newborn birds. As a result, Rostov-on-Don Zoo provided these birds to zoos all around the Soviet Union as well as to zoos in China and Romania.

On 5 September 2009, Rostov-on-Don Zoo received three elephants, which had previously been held at the Berlin Zoo Friedrichsfelde. The zoo, which hadn't had elephants in over twenty years, now hosts them in exchange for a polar bear. In December 2010, a female baby elephant was born in the zoo.

Collection 

The zoo is one of the largest zoos in Russia. It is home to about 5,000 animals belonging to 400 species. Many of these species are included on various lists of rare and endangered species: 105 species are included in the IUCN Red List, 33 species in the Red Book of Russia, and 132 species are listed in the annexes of the CITIES Convention. Rostov-on-Don Zoo works with leading scientific and public organizations from around to world to further the preservation of rare and disappearing species of animals.

Rostov-on-Don Zoo was one of the first facilities in Europe for breeding white-tailed eagles. There is also a section of the aquarium which presents a variety of inhabitants of the underwater world — from the fish of the Don region to rare freshwater stingrays and crabs from South America. There are a lot of crocodiles from Southeast Asia, a variety of turtles, snakes from Central Asia, Africa, America, as well as other exotic reptiles kept in terrarium.

References 

Tourist attractions in Rostov-on-Don
Zoos in Russia
Buildings and structures in Rostov-on-Don